"I Wanna Be with You" is a hit single by Raspberries, released in November 1972. It was written by band leader Eric Carmen, who also provided the lead vocals. It was their first single release from their second LP, Fresh. It became their second greatest US hit.

The song reached the Top 40 on three principal US charts, including number 16 on the US Billboard Hot 100, number 10 on Cash Box, and number 7 on Record World. It was also a number 17 hit in Canada.

Billboard called it a "strong rock ballad."  Cash Box described it as sounding "similar to the Beatles vocally."

Television performance
"I Wanna Be with You" was performed on The Midnight Special television program (season 1, episode 15) on May 4, 1973. The show was hosted by Johnny Nash.

Later uses
"I Wanna Be with You" was included on the Raspberries Pop Art Live CD set from their reunion concert recording, November 26, 2004, at the House of Blues in Cleveland, Ohio, released August 18, 2017.

Chart performance

Weekly charts

Year-end charts

References

Bibliography

External links
 Song Lyrics
 

1972 singles
1972 songs
Raspberries (band) songs
Capitol Records singles
Songs written by Eric Carmen
Song recordings produced by Jimmy Ienner
Jangle pop songs